Akhtiar Mohammed may refer to:
Akhtar Mohammed (Guantanamo detainee 845), participated in his Combatant Status Review Tribunal and his Administrative Review Board hearing
Akhtiar Mohammad (Guantanamo captive 1036), participated in his Combatant Status Review Tribunal and his Administrative Review Board hearing
Aktar Muhammad, Oruzgan police officer; see Oruzgan police station attack of January 2002